Keiyo South is an electoral constituency in Kenya. It is one of four constituencies of Elgeyo-Marakwet County. The constituency has 6 wards, all of which elect Member of County Assembly (MCA) for the Elgeyo Marakwet County which seats in the county Headquarters, Iten. The wards are namely: Metkei, Kabiemit, Chepkorio, Soy South and Soy North. The constituency was established for the 1969 elections.  It was one of two constituencies of the former Keiyo District.

Members of Parliament

Locations and wards

References 

Constituencies in Elgeyo-Marakwet County
Constituencies in Rift Valley Province
1969 establishments in Kenya
Constituencies established in 1969